Bicyclus jefferyi, or Jeffrey's bush brown, is a butterfly in the family Nymphalidae. It is found in the Democratic Republic of the Congo, Uganda, Rwanda, Burundi, western Tanzania, Kenya (west of the Rift Valley) and northern Zambia. The habitat consists of meadows or clearings inside or near semi-montane forests.

References

Elymniini
Butterflies described in 1963